Ebbsfleet River in Kent, south-east England, is a tributary of the Thames Estuary. It joins the Thames at Northfleet, opposite the container port of Tilbury Docks.  Today, the river gives its name to the Ebbsfleet Garden City which is currently (2020) being developed in and around the course of the Ebbsfleet.

History
It was formerly known as the River Fleet, giving its name to Northfleet and Southfleet. Its source was eight natural springs at Springhead. In Roman times the source was the site of a Roman settlement with many temples called Vagniacis, and the river was used to link Watling Street to the River Thames; in the fourteenth century it was a stopping place for pilgrims going to Canterbury. A bridge across the river at Northfleet is mentioned in 1451 and it was still tidal and used for shipping in the sixteenth century.

In the nineteenth century the river was the earliest centre in Britain for the commercial cultivation of watercress, begun by William Bradbery in 1808. He moved the business to West Hyde, Hertfordshire in 1820.

Following the removal of its waters in around 1901, when all its waters were used by the local water company, its dried riverbed was the subject of a botanical study by Marie Stopes, the birth control activist. Parts of the river can still be seen.

Etymology
The name Ebbsfleet may well be an artificial creation of the seventeenth-century antiquary Thomas Philpott and mentioned in his Villare Cantianum; the name may have been partly inspired by Ebbsfleet in Thanet,  to the east on the Kent coast. Thomas Philpott was the elder son of John Philipot, Somerset Herald, whose early list of Lords Warden of the Cinque Ports appears on p. 12 of Villare Cantianum.

References

External links
Northfleet - Northfleet Harbour Restoration Trust
Ebbsfleet Valley - website
 Ebbsfleet Garden City - website

Rivers of Kent